The 1979 WANFL season was the 95th season of the West Australian National Football League in its various incarnations, and the last of forty-nine (including three under-age wartime seasons) under that moniker.

The season set many records for high scoring due to the still-ongoing drying of Perth's climate and the new “interchange’ rule. However, the overall average score of 112.52 points per team per game was not nearly so high as in the following few years under the ‘WAFL’ moniker.

A major highlight of the 1979 season was the all-time record attendance for local West Australian football of 52,781 in the Grand Final, beating narrowly the previous record of 52,322 set in the 1975 decider.

The 1979 season was a critical turning point in the fortunes of many WANFL clubs. Perth, who had been a powerhouse ever since the end of World War II, winning six premierships and playing in the finals during twenty-four of the preceding thirty-two seasons, underwent a long-term decline that has seen the play in the finals since only in 1986, 1991 and 1997, and take the wooden spoon on seven occasions as opposed to none between 1936 and 1980. With the loss of a number of veterans and major coaching problems which culminated in the resignation of newcomer Percy Johnson for former premiership mentor Graham Campbell, West Perth, also a power club of the WANFL during the third-of-a-century before 1979, declined to their worst record since 1939 with only four wins. The Cardinals (latterly the Falcons) were to remain battlers until the middle 1990s when they moved to Arena Joondalup. On the other hand, the 1979 season saw  and  begin revivals after years near the bottom of the ladder that would see them dominate the competition during the 1980s.

Home-and-away season

Round 1

Round 2

Round 3

Round 4

Round 5

Round 6

Round 7

Round 8

Round 9

Round 10 (Foundation Day)

Round 11

Round 12

Round 12

Round 13

Round 15

Round 16

Round 17

Round 18

Round 19

Round 20

Round 21

Ladder

Finals

First semi-final

Second semi-final

Preliminary final

Grand Final

References

External links
Official WAFL website
Australian Football: WANFL Season 1979

West Australian Football League seasons
WANFL